Iana as a given name may refer to:

Iana (goddess), in ancient Roman mythology
Iana Bondar (born 1991), Ukrainian biathlete
Iana Matei, Romanian activist
Iana Salenko (born 1983), Ukrainian ballet dancer
Iana Varnacova, contestant who represented Moldova in the Miss World 2008 beauty pageant